The Calexico East Port of Entry is a border crossing point between the United States and Mexico. It connects the cities of Calexico, California and Mexicali, Baja California. It connects directly to California State Route 7.

The east crossing was built in 1996 in an effort to divert traffic from the busy Calexico West Port of Entry in downtown Calexico, California.  Since that time, all truck traffic entering the United States from Mexicali is inspected at Calexico East.  The facility is constructed of tent-like canopies and includes a bridge that crosses the All American Canal. It is a "Class A" service port with a full range of cargo processing functions.

In 2011 the site added a "Ready Lane", which allows rapid crossing if all the adults in the vehicle have a travel document enabled with Radio Frequency Identification (RFID) technology.

References

See also

 List of Mexico–United States border crossings
 List of Canada–United States border crossings

Mexico–United States border crossings
Ports of Entry in Mexicali–Imperial
Calexico, California
Mexicali
Transportation buildings and structures in Imperial County, California
1996 establishments in California
Buildings and structures completed in 1996